Scherya is a genus of flowering plants in the family Asteraceae. The only known species is Scherya bahiensis, native to the State of Bahia in eastern Brazil.

References

Eupatorieae
Endemic flora of Brazil
Monotypic Asteraceae genera